Pietrari is a commune located in Vâlcea County, Oltenia, Romania. It is composed of two villages, Pietrari and Pietrarii de Sus.

References

Communes in Vâlcea County
Localities in Oltenia